Wilfried Thaler (24 July 1934 – 15 February 2020) was an Austrian professional racing cyclist. He rode in the 1960 Tour de France.

References

External links
 

1934 births
2020 deaths
Austrian male cyclists
Place of birth missing